Thiara is a genus of freshwater snails, aquatic gastropod mollusks in the subfamily Thiarinae of the family Thiaridae.

Species

Species with accepted names within the genus Thiara include:
 † Thiara aldrichi Palmer, 1944 
 Thiara amarula (C. Linnaeus, 1758) - Africa, Australia, India
 Thiara aspera (Lesson, 1831)
 Thiara australis (I. Lea & H. C. Lea, 1851)
 Thiara bellicosa (Hinds, 1844)
 Thiara cancellata P. F. Röding, 1798 - Indo-Pacific
 Thiara epidromoides (Tapparone Canefri, 1883)
 † Thiara fallax (Oostingh, 1935) 
 Thiara herklotzi (Petit de la Saussaye, 1853)
 Thiara indefinita (I. & H. C. Lea, 1851) - Hawaiian Islands
 Thiara jingorum Thach & F. Huber, 2021
 Thiara kauaiensis (W. H. Pease, 1870) - Hawaiian Islands
 † Thiara martini (Oostingh, 1935) 
 Thiara paludomoidea Nevill, 1884 - India (unresolved name)
 Thiara prashadi Ray, 1947 - India
 Thiara rudis I. Lea, 1850 - India 
 † Thiara samarangana (K. Martin, 1884) 
 Thiara setigera (Brot, 1870)
 Thiara verrauiana I. Lea, 1856 - Hawaiian Islands
 Thiara winteri (von Dem Busch, 1842) - Indo-Pacific, spiky trumpet snail

Synonyms
 Thiara amaruloidea Iredale, 1943: synonym of Thiara amarula (Linnaeus, 1758)
 Thiara balonnensis T. A. Conrad, 1850 and Thiara lirata C. T. Menke, 1843 are synonyms of Plotiopsis balonnensis (Conrad, 1850)
 Thiara baldwini C. F. Ancey, 1899 - Hawaiian Islands: synonym of Melanoides tuberculata (O. F. Müller, 1774) (junior synonym)
  † Thiara fiscina Yokoyama, 1932: synonym of † Semisulcospira fiscina (Yokoyama, 1932) (new combination)
 Thiara granifera (Lamarck, 1822): synonym of Tarebia granifera (Lamarck, 1816)
 Thiara lineata Gray, 1828 - India: synonym of Tarebia granifera (Lamarck, 1822)
 Thiara punctata (J. B. Lamarck, 1822) - India: synonym of Stenomelania punctata (Lamarck, 1822)
 Thiara riquetii (Grateloup, 1840): synonym of Sermyla riquetii (Grateloup, 1840)
 Thiara rodericensis (E. A. Smith, 1876): synonym of Melanoides tuberculata (O. F. Müller, 1774)
 Thiara scabra (O. F. Müller, 1774) - Indo-Pacific: synonym of Mieniplotia scabra (O. F. Müller, 1774)
 Thiara scabra lyriformis I. Lea, 1850 - Japan
 Thiara scabra pagoda I. Lea, 1850 - Japan
 Thiara scabra subplicatula Smith, 1878 - Japan
 Thiara speciosa A. Adams, 1854: synonym of Thiara amarula (C. Linnaeus, 1758) 
 Thiara torulosa (Bruguière, 1789) - India: synonym of Stenomelania torulosa (Bruguière, 1789)
 Thiara tuberculata (O. F. Müller, 1774): synonym of Melanoides tuberculata (O. F. Müller, 1774)
 Thiara vouamica Bourguignat, 1890: synonym of Thiara amarula (Linnaeus, 1758) (junior synonym)

References

External links
 Röding, P.F. (1798). Museum Boltenianum sive Catalogus cimeliorum e tribus regnis naturæ quæ olim collegerat Joa. Fried Bolten, M. D. p. d. per XL. annos proto physicus Hamburgensis. Pars secunda continens Conchylia sive Testacea univalvia, bivalvia & multivalvia. Trapp, Hamburg. viii, 199 pp
 Brot, A. (1871). Catalogue of the Recent species of the family Melanidae. American Journal of Conchology. 6(4): 271-325
  Swainson, W. (1840). A treatise on malacology or shells and shell-fish. London, Longman. viii + 419 pp
 Sowerby, G. B. II. (1842). A conchological manual. 2nd Edition. 1–313, 2 folding tables, 26 pls. London: Henry G. Bohn
  Glaubrecht M., Brinkmann N. & Pöppe J. (2009). Diversity and disparity ‘down under': Systematics, biogeography and reproductive modes of the ‘marsupial' freshwater Thiaridae (Caenogastropoda, Cerithioidea) in Australia. Zoosystematics and Evolution. 85(2): 199-275

Thiaridae